A Lolo Ball, also known as a POGO BAL, Springbal, Lolobal, Disc-O, Pogo ball, or Pogo-It, is a toy. It consists of a seamless figure-8 rubber ball locked into a structurally supported, sturdy plastic platform. To play with it, one stands on the plastic platform, balancing one's weight on the bottom portion of the rubber ball, and jumps or hops around in the same manner as one would use a pogo stick.

Invented by two Belgian men Van Der Cleyen and Ribbens in 1969,  the Pogo Bal became a fad in the mid-1980s when Hasbro mass-produced it. Hasbro produced the toy until the early 1990s, and similar products have been made by other manufacturers. One of the current examples of a modern lolo ball are Little Tikes' Pogo-It, released in 2017. It has 2 game modes and a more colorful look complete with LED lights.

References

External links 

A legal case about who owns the rights to the Lolo Ball
Info on Little Tikes' Pogo-It

Physical activity and dexterity toys
1980s toys
Rubber toys